Mule Creek Airport  is located near to Mule Creek, British Columbia, Canada.

References

Registered aerodromes in British Columbia
Atlin District